Acton Scott is a village and parish near Church Stretton in Shropshire, England. The population of the civil parish at the 2011 Census was 104. It lies in the Shropshire Hills area of outstanding natural beauty. The settlement was recorded as Actune in the 1086 Domesday Book.

The Acton family live on the  manorial estate and have worked it since the twelfth century.

It is most well known for the  Acton Scott Historic Working Farm (currently closed), founded by the estate's then owner Tom Acton in 1975 a Victorian living museum featured in the 2009 Victorian Farm BBC TV series. Visitors to the farm could take part in various workshops and courses on such activities as turning butter, hand-milking cows and herding live-stock. Many skills such as bodging, forging, pole-lathing, wheel and brick-making were demonstrated. The museum, which was run by Shropshire Council on lease from the Acton Scott manor estate, closed in June 2021 for economic reasons. The Council planned to relinquish the lease to the estate in 2023.

See also
 Listed buildings in Acton Scott

References

External links

 Acton Scott Estate
 

Villages in Shropshire
Tourist attractions in Shropshire
Civil parishes in Shropshire